The Pacification of Algeria was a series of military operations after the French conquest of the Regency of Algiers that aimed to put an end to various tribal rebellions, razzias and massacres of French settlers that were sporadically held in the Algerian countryside. The conflict was an early example of unconventional warfare.

Background 

After the capture of Algiers by France and the defeat of Ottoman troops, France invaded the rest of the country. The end of military resistance to the French presence did not mean that the region was totally conquered. France faced several tribal rebellions, massacres of settlers and razzias in French Algeria. To eliminate them, many campaigns and colonisation operations were conducted over nearly 70 years, from 1835 to 1903.

Campaigns

First Campaign against Abd-el-Kader (1835–1837) 

Tribal elders in the territories near Mascara chose the 25-year-old `Abd al-Qādir (Abd-el-Kader), to lead the jihad against the French. Recognised as Amir al-Muminin (commander of the faithful), he quickly gained the support of tribes in the western territories. In 1834, he concluded a treaty with General Desmichels, who was then military commander of the French Department of Oran. The treaty was reluctantly accepted by the French administration and made France recognise Abd al-Qādir as the sovereign of the territory in Oran Province not under French control, and it authorized him to send consuls to French-held cities. The treaty did not require Abd al-Qādir to recognize French rule, something glossed over in its French text. He used the peace provided by the treaty to widen his influence with tribes throughout western and central Algeria.

D'Erlon was apparently unaware of the danger posed by Abd al-Qādir's activities, but General Camille Alphonse Trézel, then in command at Oran, saw it and attempted to separate some of the tribes from Abd al-Qādir. When he succeeded in convincing two tribes near Oran to acknowledge French supremacy, Abd al-Qādir dispatched troops to move those tribes to the interior, away from French influence. Trézel countered by marching a column of troops out from Oran to protect those tribes' territory on 16 June 1835. After exchanging threats, Abd al-Qādir withdrew his consul from Oran and ejected the French consul from Mascara, a de facto declaration of war. The two forces clashed in a bloody but inconclusive engagement near the Sig River. However, when the French, who were short on provisions, began withdrawing toward Arzew, Abd al-Qādir led 20,000 men against the beleaguered column and, in the Battle of Macta routed the force, killing 500 men. The debacle led to the recall of d'Erlon.

General Clausel was appointed a second time to replace d'Erlon and led an attack against Mascara in December of that year, which Abd al-Qādir, with advance warning, had evacuated. In January 1836, he occupied Tlemcen and established a garrison there before he returned to Algiers to plan an attack against Constantine. Abd al-Qādir continued to harry the French at Tlemcen and so additional troops, under Thomas Robert Bugeaud, a veteran of the Napoleonic Wars experienced in irregular warfare, were sent from Oran to secure control up to the Tafna River and to resupply the garrison. Abd al-Qādir retreated before Bugeaud but decided to make a stand on the banks of the Sikkak River. On July 6, 1836, Bugeaud decisively defeated al-Qādir in the Battle of Sikkak, losing fewer than 50 men to more than 1,000 casualties suffered by Abd al-Qādir. The battle was one of the few formal battles that al-Qādir engaged in; after the loss, he restricted his actions as much as possible to guerilla-style attacks.

In May 1837, General Thomas Robert Bugeaud, then in command of Oran, negotiated the Treaty of Tafna with al-Qādir that effectively recognised al-Qādir's control over much of the interior of what is now Algeria.

Second Campaign against Abd-el-Kader (1839–1847) 
Al-Qādir used the Treaty of Tafna to consolidate his power over tribes throughout the interior by establishing new cities far from French control. He worked to motivate the population under French control to resist by peaceful and military means.  Seeking to face the French again, he laid claim under the treaty to territory that included the main route between Algiers and Constantine. When French troops contested that claim in late 1839 by marching through a mountain defile known as the Iron Gates, al-Qādir claimed a breach of the treaty and renewed calls for jihad. Throughout 1840, he waged guerilla war against the French in the provinces of Algiers and Oran, which Valée's failures to deal with adequately led to his replacement in December 1840 by General Bugeaud.

Bugeaud instituted a strategy of scorched earth, combined with fast-moving cavalry columns like those used by al-Qādir to take territory from him gradually. The troops' tactics were heavy-handed, and the population suffered significantly. Al-Qādir was eventually forced to establish a mobile headquarters, which was known as a smala or zmelah.  In 1843, French forces successfully raided his camp while he was away from it and captured more than 5,000 fighters and al-Qādir's warchest.

Al-Qādir was forced to retreat into Morocco from which he had been receiving some support, especially from tribes in the border areas.  When French diplomatic efforts to persuade Morocco to expel al-Qādir failed, the French resorted to military means with the First Franco-Moroccan War in 1844 to compel the sultan to change his policy.

Eventually hemmed between French and Moroccan troops on the border in December 1847, al-Qādir chose to surrender to the French under terms that would allow him to go into exile in the Middle East. The French violated the terms by holding him in France until 1852, when he was allowed to go to Damascus.

Campaign of Kabylie (1857)

Campaign against El-Mokrani (1871)

Conquest of the Sahara (1881–1902)

South-Oranese Campaign (1897–1903) 

In the 1890s, the French administration and military called for the annexation of the Touat, the Gourara and the Tidikelt, a complex that had been part of the Moroccan Empire for many centuries prior to the arrival of the French in Algeria.

An armed conflict opposed French 19th Corps Oran and Algiers divisions to the Aït Khabbash, a fraction of the Moroccan Aït Ounbgui khams of the Aït Atta confederation. The conflict ended by the annexation of the Touat-Gourara-Tidikelt complex by France in 1901.

In the early 20th century, France faced numerous incidents, attacks and looting by uncontrolled armed groups in the newly occupied areas in the south of Oran. Under the command of General Hubert Lyautey, the French Army's mission was to protect the areas newly controlled in the west of Algeria, near the poorly-defined Moroccan boundaries.

The loose boundary, between French Algeria and the Sultanate of Morocco, promotes incursions and attacks perpetrated by Moroccan tribesmen.

On 17 August 1903, the first battle of the South-Oranese campaign took place in Taghit in which French Foreign legionnaires were assailed by a contingent of more than 1,000 well-equipped Berbers. For 3 days, the legionnaires repelled repeated attacks of an enemy more than 10 times higher in number and inflicted huge losses on the attackers, forcing them finally into a hasty retreat.

A few days after the Battle of Taghit, 148 legionnaires of the 22nd mounted company, from the 2e REI, commanded by Captain Vauchez and Lieutenant Selchauhansen, 20 Spahis and 2 Mokhaznis, forming part of escorting a supply convoy, were ambushed, on September 2, by 3,000 Moroccans tribesmen, at El-Moungar.

Atrocities
During their pacification of Algeria, French forces engaged in a scorched earth policy against the Algerian population. Returning from an investigation trip to Algeria, Tocqueville wrote that "we make war much more barbaric than the Arabs themselves [...] it is for their part that civilization is situated." Colonel Montagnac stated that the purpose of the pacification was to "destroy everything that crawl at our feet like dogs." The scorched earth policy, decided by Governor General Bugeaudhas, had devastating effects on the socio-economic and food balances of the country: "we fire little gunshot, we burn all douars, all villages, all huts; the enemy flees across taking his flock." According to Olivier Le Cour Grandmaison, the colonisation of Algeria led to the extermination of a third of the population from multiple causes (massacres, deportations, famines or epidemics) that were all interrelated.

French forces deported and banished entire Algerian tribes. The great Moorish families (of Spanish origin) of Tlemcen were exiled to the Orient (Levant), and others were emigrated elsewhere. The tribes that were considered too troublesome were banned, and some took refuge in Tunisia, Morocco and even Syria. Other tribes were deported to New Caledonia or Guyana. Also, French forces also engaged in wholesale massacres of entire tribes. All 500 men, women and children of the El Oufia tribe were killed in one night. All 500 to 700 members of the Ouled Rhia tribe were killed by suffocation in a cave. During the Siege of Laghouat, the French army engaged in one of the first instances of recorded use of chemical weapon on civilians and other atrocities causing Algerians to refer to the period as the year of the "Khalya", Arabic for emptiness, which is commonly known to the inhabitants of Laghouat as the year that the city was emptied of its population. It is also commonly known as the year of Hessian sacks, referring to the way the captured surviving men and boys were put alive in the hessian sacks and thrown into dug-up trenches.

Characterisation as genocide 
Some governments and scholars have called France's conquest of Algeria a genocide, such as Ben Kiernan, an Australian expert on the Cambodian genocide, who wrote in Blood and Soil: A World History of Genocide and Extermination from Sparta to Darfur on the French conquest of Algeria:
By 1875, the French conquest was complete. The war had killed approximately 825,000 indigenous Algerians since 1830. A long shadow of genocidal hatred persisted, provoking a French author to protest in 1882 that in Algeria, "we hear it repeated every day that we must expel the native and if necessary destroy him." As a French statistical journal urged five years late, "the system of extermination must give way to a policy of penetration."

-Ben Kiernan, Blood and Soil

See also
 Insurgency
 French Algeria

References

French Algeria
19th-century conflicts
19th century in Algeria
Wars involving France
Battles involving the French Foreign Legion
1900s in Algeria
Genocides in Africa